"The Power of Love" is a 1985 single by Huey Lewis and the News, written for the soundtrack of the 1985 blockbuster film Back to the Future. The song became the band's first number-one hit on the U.S. Billboard Hot 100 and their second number-one hit on the U.S. Mainstream Rock chart. In the United Kingdom, it was released as a double-A side with "Do You Believe in Love", becoming the band's only top ten hit on the UK Singles Chart. The song is included alongside "Back in Time" on the film's soundtrack, and appears as a bonus track on international editions of the band's fourth studio album, Fore!.

Development
Huey Lewis was approached to write a theme song for the film. He met with Bob Gale, Steven Spielberg, and Robert Zemeckis, from the film's production team, who intended that the band be Marty McFly's favorite band. Though flattered, Lewis did not want to participate because he did not know how to write film songs and did not want to write one called "Back to the Future". Zemeckis assured Lewis he could write any song he wanted. Lewis agreed to submit the next song he wrote, which was "The Power of Love". The lyrics do not make any mention of the film's storyline.

Use in Back to the Future
The song appears early in Back to the Future as Marty McFly (played by Michael J. Fox) skateboards to school.
Later in the film, McFly and his band play a hard rock version of the song for a Battle of the Bands audition, at which a judge played by Huey Lewis tells Marty's group that they are "just too darn loud", and later when Marty returns to his neighborhood. In the sequel, Back to the Future Part II, the 2015 version of Marty attempts to play the song on his guitar just after being fired but ends up playing it very poorly due to his damaged hand from his 1985 accident with a Rolls-Royce. Finally, it can be briefly heard playing in the car where Needles and his buddies are driving when Needles challenges Marty to the fate-determining car race near the end of Back to the Future Part III.

Music video
The music video, filmed in June 1985, shows the band playing in a nightclub (Uncle Charlie's, a frequent stop for the band in their early career) with Emmett Brown (Christopher Lloyd) showing up in his DeLorean, apparently after time-traveling, and a couple stealing it for a joy ride. Lewis said filming took the entire day and night to complete, with the band finishing up at 3:00 AM. The video is included as a bonus feature in several home video releases of Back to the Future.

Mixes
Three different mixes of the song have co-existed since its release in 1985. The Back to the Future soundtrack version, also the version used in the music video, has a run time of 3:51.

A 12" version of the song was released to most countries, remixed by John "Jellybean" Benitez, features a seven-minute dance version with changes in its mix such as additional backing keyboards and an extended guitar solo.

A 7" single released in 1985 to radio in some countries as promotion of the film contains an edit of the aforementioned extended remix, with a run time of 4:21. In selected countries, this shorter edit was featured on the B-side of the 12" single. Whilst this version is occasionally played on radio, it has only ever been included on one Huey Lewis "Best Of", and as a result is a very rare version of the song.

Reception
Cash Box said that "the inimitable charm and drive which made Sports such a pop/rock winner is displayed from the first chords".

At the 13th Annual American Music Awards, the song was nominated for "Favorite Single" and "Favorite Video Single", winning in both categories. The song was nominated for an Academy Award for Best Original Song at the 58th Academy Awards but lost to Lionel Richie's "Say You, Say Me". It was also nominee at the 28th Annual Grammy Awards for Record of the Year, but lost against USA for Africa's "We Are the World", to which Lewis and his bandmates had contributed backing vocals.

Track listings 

7-inch Chrysalis / HUEY 1 United Kingdom
 "The Power of Love" – 3:53
 "Bad Is Bad" – 3:46

7-inch Chrysalis / HUEY 3 United Kingdom
 "The Power of Love"
 "Do You Believe in Love?"
 also released as a 7-inch picture disc HUEYP 3
 1986 re-issue

7-inch Chrysalis / 107 614 Canada
 "The Power of Love" – 4:21
 "Finally Found a Home" – 3:41

7-inch Chrysalis / CHS-42876 Canada
 "The Power of Love" – 3:53
 "Bad is Bad" – 3:46

12-inch Chrysalis / CS 42889 United States
 "The Power of Love" (Long version) – 7:10
 "The Power of Love" (Instrumental) – 4:12
 "The Power of Love" (Short version) – 4:18

12-inch Chrysalis / HUEYX1 United Kingdom
 "The Power of Love" – 7:10
 "Bad Is Bad" – 3:46
 "It's All Right" (Live version) (Curtis Mayfield) – 3:03
 "I Want a New Drug" (Live version) – 5:57

12-inch Chrysalis / HUEYX3 United Kingdom
 "The Power of Love" (Extended version)
 "Do You Believe in Love?"
 "Back in Time"
 1986 re-issue

12-inch Chrysalis / 601 822 Germany
 "The Power of Love" – 7:10
 "It's All Right" (Live version) (Curtis Mayfield) – 3:03
 "I Want a New Drug" (Live version) – 5:57

Personnel 
 Huey Lewis – lead vocals
 Sean Hopper – keyboards, backing vocals
 Bill Gibson – drums, percussion, backing vocals
 Johnny Colla – rhythm guitar, backing vocals
 Mario Cipollina – bass
 Chris Hayes – lead guitar, backing vocals

Charts 
"The Power of Love" debuted on the Billboard Hot 100 chart at No. 46 for the week ending June 29, 1985, with Billboard calling the song "an out-of-the-box monster hit".

Weekly charts

Year-end charts

Certifications

See also
 List of number-one singles in Australia during the 1980s
 List of number-one singles of 1985 (Canada)
 List of Billboard Hot 100 number-one singles of 1985
 List of Billboard Mainstream Rock number-one songs of the 1980s

References

1985 songs
1985 singles
Huey Lewis and the News songs
Chrysalis Records singles
Billboard Hot 100 number-one singles
Cashbox number-one singles
Number-one singles in Australia
RPM Top Singles number-one singles
Songs written by Chris Hayes (musician)
Songs written by Johnny Colla
Songs written by Huey Lewis
Songs written for films
Music from Back to the Future (franchise)